Islam is a minority religion in South Sudan. Most Muslims welcomed secession in the South Sudanese independence referendum. The last census to mention the religion of southerners dates back to 1956 where a majority were classified as following traditional beliefs or were Christian while 18% were Muslim. The most recent Pew Research Center on Religion and Public Life report from December 2012 estimated that in 2010, there were 610,000 Muslims in South Sudan, comprising 6.2% of the country's population.

See also 
 Religion in South Sudan

References

External links
Islamic increase perceived in Wau as life is routine.